Messa di voce  (Italian, placing of the voice) is a singing technique that requires sustaining a single pitch while gradually making the voice louder (crescendo) and then softer (diminuendo). It is considered to be a particularly advanced test of singing ability.

Messa di voce should not be confused with mezza voce (Italian, "half voice") which means to sing at half strength.

Technique

The messa di voce is universally considered a very advanced vocal technique. To be properly executed, the only feature of the note being sung that should change is the volume – not the pitch, intonation, timbre, vibrato, and so on. This requires an extremely high level of vocal coordination, particularly in the diminuendo, so the technique is not often explicitly called for and is rarely heard outside classical music.

History

In Western art music, the messa di voce was associated with famous castrati such as Farinelli (and is now a mark of the mezzo-sopranos and countertenors who sing the same roles in Baroque operas). It was also popular in the bel canto period, when it was often used as a dramatic opening flourish for an aria, for example "Casta diva" from Norma. Another example from a later period is "Pace! Pace, mio Dio", from Verdi’s "La Forza del destino". It became less common as the popular style of opera singing evolved from the light and elaborate music of that era to the louder and more speech-like singing of the middle and later 19th century.

In the popular music of the West messa di voce has been even less common. It still appears occasionally in some of the more ornate styles of popular music, however, like gospel and other styles influenced by it.

References

Italian opera terminology